Events in the year 1878 in Argentina.

Incumbents
 President: Nicolás Avellaneda
 Vice President: Mariano Acosta

Governors
 Buenos Aires Province: Carlos Casares (until 1 May); Carlos Tejedor (from 1 May)
 Cordoba: Antonio Del Viso 
 Mendoza Province: Julio Gutiérrez (until 15 February); Elías Villanueva (from 15 February)
 Santa Fe Province: Servando Bayo then Simón de Iriondo

Vice Governors
Buenos Aires Province: Luis Sáenz Peña (until 1 May); José María Moreno (starting 1 May)

Events
May 23 - chartering of Bank of the City of Buenos Aires as the Monte de Piedad in a measure against the prevalence of usury in Buenos Aires (mostly targeting the growing wave of immigration in Argentina)

Births

Deaths
January 8 – Gauchito Gil, legendary religious figure (b. 1847)

References

 
1870s in Argentina
History of Argentina (1852–1880)
Years of the 19th century in Argentina